is a 2000 Japanese film directed by Takashi Yamazaki in his directorial debut.

Synopsis 
Summer, 2000. Eleven-year-old Yusuke and his classmates are camping in a woods when suddenly they see a bright light streak over the treetops and into the woods. The boys take off into the woods towards the light. There in the ground, growing, they find a small round metallic object. Just as Yusuke reaches to touch it, the mysterious object pops up a set of eyes and the object says;

"I am Tetra, I meet Yusuke".
Startled Yusuke replies "Your name is Tetra? Cool!"

Tetra is kept from adult eyes in Yusuke's closet. Tetra creates wonderful gadgets using "never-seen-before" technology. It would appear Tetra was designed with artificial intelligence. But where did Tetra come from and what is its purpose? As the relationship grows between Yusuke and Tetra, these questions are answered.

Characters
 Yusuke Sakamoto (坂本裕介 Sakamoto Yūsuke) - Yusuke is the main character. Yusuke hides Tetra in his room.
 Tetra (テトラ) - Tetra is a robot who has highly advanced artificial intelligence. Tetra came from the future with the keyword "juvenile".
 Soichiro Kanzaki (神崎宗一郎 Kanzaki Sōichirō) - An electronics shop owner who introduces Yusuke to Tetra. Kanzaki is the only adult that the children trust with the secret of Tetra.
 Misaki Kinoshita (木下 岬 Kinoshita Misaki) - One of Yusuke's friends. She wishes to connect Tetra to the internet.
 Noriko Kinoshita (木下範子 Kinoshita Noriko) - Misaki's sister in law. Noriko becomes one of Soichiro's allies in his Physics research.
 Toshiya Matsuoka (松岡俊也 Matsuoka Toshiya) - Misaki's playmate.
 Hidetaka Ohno (大野秀隆 Ōno Hidetaka) - Hidetaka is Toshiya's "gopher." Hidetaka, who is thought to be the source of information at his school, is easily able to find information and proves handy to Yusuke and his friends.

Cast
 Megumi Hayashibara - Tetra (voice) / Female Researcher
 Shingo Katori - Soichiro Kamizaki
 Miki Sakai - Noriko Kinoshita
 Anne Suzuki - Misaki Kinoshita
 Yuya Endo - Yusuke Sakamoto
 Kyotaro Shimizu - Hidetaka Ohno
 Yuki - Toshiya Matsuoka
 Katsumi Takahashi - Yusuke's Father 
 Kuniko Asagi - Yusuke's Mother 
 Kinzoh Sakura
 Takashi Matsuo - Misawa 
 Kazue Tsunogae - Snack Shop Lady 
 Teruo Takeno - Byoid (voice)

External links
 Official Website
 Juvenile at the Internet Movie Database
 

2000 films
Films directed by Takashi Yamazaki
2000s Japanese-language films
Japanese robot films
2000 science fiction films
2000s Japanese films